Igor Caique Coronado (born 18 August 1992) is a Brazilian professional footballer who plays as an attacking midfielder for Saudi Professional League club Al-Ittihad.

Club career

Early years
Coronado joined the academy of English club Milton Keynes Dons at the age of 15 in 2007. On 7 May 2011, at the age of 18, he was named amongst the substitutes for the club's final game of the 2010–11 season against Oldham Athletic.

Following his release from the club after the end of the 2010–11 season, Coronado joined the reserve team of Swiss club Grasshoppers for a brief period before signing for English seventh-tier club Banbury United.

Floriana
In November 2012, Coronado joined Maltese Premier League club Floriana. His league debut for Floriana came on 10 November 2012 in a 2–2 away draw with Melita. His first league goal for the club came on 10 December 2012 in a 3–1 home win over Balzan. His goal, the third of the match for Floriana, came in the 48th minute. During his time with the club, Coronado scored a total of 32 goals in 63 league appearances, including three hat-tricks.

Trapani
On 12 August 2015, Coronado joined Italian Serie B club Trapani on a season-long loan. On 6 September 2015, he made his debut for the club, scoring in a 3–0 home win over Ternana. His first league goal for the club also came in that match, coming in the 52nd minute.

Palermo
On 11 July 2017, Coronado joined newly-relegated Serie B club Palermo on a four-year contract. His league debut came on 26 August 2017 in a 2–0 home win over Spezia Calcio. He picked up an assist in that match, setting up Ilija Nestorovski for his 52nd-minute goal. His first league goal for Palermo came on 9 September 2017 in a 3–3 home draw with Empoli. His goal, assisted by Eddy Gnahoré, came in the 14th minute. His first league hat-trick for Palermo came on 25 March 2018 in a 4–0 victory over Carpi. His goals, the first of which was from the penalty spot, came in the 18th, 47th, and 76th minutes. The second goal was assisted by Andrea Rispoli, and the third came from Gabriele Rolando.

Al-Ittihad
After three years with Sharjah, Coronado joined Saudi Professional League club Al-Ittihad for a reported $12m fee in July 2021.

Career statistics

 Assist Goals

Honours
Floriana
Maltese Summer Cup: 2013

Sharjah
UAE Pro League: 2018–19
UAE Super Cup: 2019

Al-Ittihad
Saudi Super Cup: 2022

Individual
Maltese Premier League Best Foreign Player: 2013
 Saudi Professional League Player of the Month: September 2021

References

External links
 
 

1992 births
Sportspeople from Londrina
Brazilian people of Italian descent
Living people
Brazilian footballers
Brazilian expatriate footballers
Banbury United F.C. players
Milton Keynes Dons F.C. players
Floriana F.C. players
Maltese Premier League players
Trapani Calcio players
Palermo F.C. players
Sharjah FC players
Ittihad FC players
Serie B players
UAE Pro League players
Saudi Professional League players
Association football midfielders
Expatriate footballers in Malta
Expatriate footballers in England
Expatriate footballers in Switzerland
Expatriate footballers in Italy
Expatriate footballers in the United Arab Emirates
Expatriate footballers in Saudi Arabia
Brazilian expatriate sportspeople in Malta
Brazilian expatriate sportspeople in Switzerland
Brazilian expatriate sportspeople in Italy
Brazilian expatriate sportspeople in the United Arab Emirates
Brazilian expatriate sportspeople in Saudi Arabia